The National Youth Orchestra of Ireland (NYOI) is the national youth orchestra of Ireland, founded in 1970 by Olive Smith and the Music Association of Ireland.

It is a member of the European Federation of National Youth Orchestras.

See also 
 List of youth orchestras

References 

Music education organizations
National youth orchestras
Irish orchestras
European youth orchestras
Musical groups established in 1970